Evan Shefflin (born 12 September 1999) is an Irish hurler who plays for Kilkenny Senior Championship club Ballyhale Shamrocks and at inter-county level with the Kilkenny under-21 hurling team. He usually lines out as a midfielder. He is a nephew of Henry Shefflin.

Playing career

St. Kieran's College

In school, Shefflin played hurling with St. Kieran's College in Kilkenny, ultimately joining the college's senior hurling team. On 26 February 2017, he won a Leinster Colleges Championship medal after scoring a point from right wing-forward in a 1-14 to 0-13 defeat of Kilkenny CBS in the final. On 25 March 2017, Shefflin was switched to left corner-forward for the All-Ireland final against Our Lady's Secondary School from Templemore. He was held scoreless from play and ended the game on the losing side after a 3-13 to 3-11 defeat.

DCU Dóchas Éireann

As a student at Dublin City University, Shefflin became involved in hurling as a member of the university's freshers' team. He has since lined out in several Fitzgibbon Cup campaigns.

Ballyhale Shamrocks

Shefflin joined the Ballyhale Shamrocks club at a young age and played in all grades at juvenile and underage levels. He had championship success in the minor and under-21 grades, before eventually joining the club's top adult team in the Kilkenny Senior Championship.

On 28 October 2018, Shefflin lined out in his first senior final when Ballyhale Shamrocks faced Bennettsbridge. Playing at right wing-back, he ended the game with his first winners' medal after the 2-20 to 2-17 victory. Shefflin again lined out at right wing-back when Ballyhale qualified to play Ballyboden St. Enda's in the Leinster final on 2 December 2018. He scored a point from play and claimed his first Leinster Club Championship medal after a 2-21 to 0-11 victory. On 17 March 2019, Shefflin was again at right wing-back when Ballyhale qualified for an All-Ireland final meeting with St. Thomas's. He scored a point from play and claimed an All-Ireland Club Championship medal following the 2-28 to 2-11 victory.

On 27 October 2019, Holden lined out at full-back when Ballyhale Shamrocks faced James Stephens in the Kilkenny Championship final. He collected a sixth winners' medal after the 2-21 to 1-15 victory. On 1 December 2019, Holden again lined out at full-back when Ballyhale Shamrocks faced St. Mullin's in the Leinster final. He ended the game with a fifth winners' medal following the 1-21 to 0-15 victory. On 18 January 2020, Holden made his fourth All-Ireland final appearance when Ballyhale Shamrocks faced Borris-Ileigh. He ended the game with a fourth All-Ireland medal after the 0-18 to 0-15 victory.

Kilkenny

Minor and under-20

Shefflin first lined out for Kilkenny as a member of the minor team during the 2017 Leinster Championship. On 2 July 2017, he was an unused substitute when Kilkenny defeated Dublin by 3-15 to 1-17 to win the Leinster Championship. 

Shefflin was drafted onto the Kilkenny under-20 team in advance of the 2019 Leinster Championship and was appointed captain of the team. He made his first appearance for the team on 24 June 2019 when he scored three points from midfield in the 5-21 to 0-10 defeat of Laois. On 17 July 2019, Shefflin won a Leinster Championship medal after scoring 1-02 from midfield when Kilkenny defeated Wexford by 1-17 to 0-18 in the Leinster final.

Senior

Shefflin was drafted onto the Kilkenny senior team in advance of the 2019 Leinster Championship. On 30 June 2019, he was a member of the extended panel when Kilkenny suffered a 1-23 to 0-23 defeat by Wexford in the Leinster final. On 18 August 2019, Shefflin was again a member of the extended panel when Kilkenny lost out to Tipperary by 3-25 to 0-20 in the All-Ireland final.

Career statistics

Honours

St. Kieran's College
Leinster Colleges Senior Hurling Championship (1): 2017

DCU Dóchas Éireann
All-Ireland Freshers' Hurling Championship (1): 2018

Ballyhale Shamrocks
All-Ireland Senior Club Hurling Championship (2): 2019, 2020
Leinster Senior Club Hurling Championship (2): 2018, 2019
Kilkenny Senior Hurling Championship (2): 2018, 2019
Kilkenny Under-21 Hurling Championship (2): 2017, 2018
Kilkenny Minor Roinn A hurling Championship (1): 2016

Kilkenny
Leinster Under-20 Hurling Championship (1): 2019 (c)
Leinster Minor Hurling Championship (1): 2017

References

1999 births
Living people
DCU hurlers
Ballyhale Shamrocks hurlers
Kilkenny inter-county hurlers